Knut Rønningen (20 July 1938 – 3 February 2020) was a Norwegian biotechnologist.

He was born in Tylldalen. He studied at the Norwegian College of Agriculture, Edinburgh and Cornell University, before finally taking his dr.agric. degree at the Norwegian College of Agriculture in 1970. He became a professor at the Swedish University of Agricultural Sciences in 1972, then at the Norwegian School of Veterinary Science in 1981. Here he also served as prorector from 1989 to 1995.

He was a member of the Norwegian Academy of Science and Letters from 1987. Among his board memberships, he chaired the board of Matforsk.

References

1938 births
2020 deaths
People from Tynset
Biotechnologists
Norwegian College of Agriculture alumni
Cornell University alumni
Academic staff of the Swedish University of Agricultural Sciences
Academic staff of the Norwegian School of Veterinary Science
Norwegian expatriates in Scotland
Norwegian expatriates in the United States
Norwegian expatriates in Sweden
Members of the Norwegian Academy of Science and Letters